Portage station is an Amtrak intercity train station in Portage, Wisconsin, served by Amtrak's daily Empire Builder service. The depot is a small square brick structure constructed during the Amtrak era that is located near a Canadian Pacific Railway yard office. The office occupies what was formerly the Portage passenger depot, served by the Chicago, Milwaukee, St. Paul and Pacific Railroad (Milwaukee Road) prior to the creation of Amtrak. There are no station staff in Portage. In October 2011, Lamers Bus Lines began offering a daily stop at the station, with service between Madison and Wausau, this service was transferred to Van Galder Coach USA in 2022. Portage along with neighboring Columbus provide Amtrak rail service to the Madison area. Portage is also slated to benefit from expanded service via the TCMC route which will service Portage station with an additional Chicago-St Paul round trip beginning in 2024 and planned additional rail service to Madison and Eau Claire by 2035.

Statistics

See also
 List of intercity bus stops in Wisconsin

References

External links 

 Portage Amtrak Station (USA Rail Guide - Train Web)

Amtrak stations in Wisconsin
Buildings and structures in Columbia County, Wisconsin
Portage, Wisconsin
Former Chicago, Milwaukee, St. Paul and Pacific Railroad stations